Burmese Harp, or The Burmese Harp, may refer to:

Burmese harp, or saung, a harp played in Burma
The Burmese Harp, a 1946 Japanese children's novel by Michio Takeyama
The Burmese Harp (1956 film), a Japanese film based on the book and directed by Kon Ichikawa
The Burmese Harp (1985 film), a remake of the 1956 film by Kon Ichikawa
 The Harp of Burma, a 1986 Japanese animated television adaptation of the novel